Gamboma Airport  is an airport serving the city of Gamboma in the Plateaux Department of Republic of the Congo.

See also

 List of airports in the Republic of the Congo
 Transport in the Republic of the Congo

References

External links
OurAirports - Gamboma
OpenStreetMap - Gamboma

Airports in the Republic of the Congo